Wakan Q'allay (Quechua, waka cow, -n a suffix, q'allay to cut into small pieces, Hispanicized spelling Huajancallay) is a mountain in the Andes of Peru, about  high. It is situated in the Huancavelica Region, Huaytará Province,  Pilpichaca District. Wakan Q'allay lies east of Qispi Q'awa.

References

Mountains of Peru
Mountains of Huancavelica Region